The Journal of Elections, Public Opinion & Parties (print: ,) is a peer-reviewed academic journal that publishes articles relating to elections, public opinion, participation, and political parties.

External links 
 

Political science journals
English-language journals
Quarterly journals
Taylor & Francis academic journals
Publications established in 1991